"The Mind and the Matter" is episode 63 of the American television anthology series The Twilight Zone. It originally aired on May 12, 1961 on CBS.

Opening narration

Plot
Archibald Beechcroft, a misanthropist, has a crowded time getting to work, and becomes annoyed when errand boy Henry spills coffee all over his suit. Taking some aspirin in the bathroom, his boss Mr. Rogers lectures him about a proper lifestyle to maintain his health. Aggravated, Beechcroft says he's fed up with the crowded conditions at the office and wants to eliminate all the people of the world.

In the cafeteria for lunch, Henry apologizes to Beechcroft further for spilling the coffee, saving him a seat and presenting him with a book titled The Mind and the Matter, which deals with the ultimate in concentration; Henry explains that his friend has learned how to make things happen with his mind. Beechcroft leafs through the book in the cafeteria, continues to read it on the subway ride home, and finishes it over dinner in his apartment. When his landlady knocks to collect his rent, he tests the theory that concentration is the greatest power in the world, and successfully makes her disappear.

The next day, Beechcroft uses his concentration to make his crowded subway station empty of people. He rides an empty subway train to his empty office, with doors opening for him. Though he takes satisfaction in his newfound peace and quiet, he soon grows bored. Reflections of himself appear, taunting him as bored and lonely. He tries causing diversions such as an earthquake and thunderstorm, but isn't entertained. He glumly rides the empty train subway home, where he is again taunted by his reflection. Arguing with it, he gets the idea  of repopulating the world with people like himself.

He does so, and the next morning the crowds in the subway and elevator are back, but now everyone has his face and antisocial personality. Dismayed, he returns the world to the way it used to be. Henry again spills coffee on him, and asks about the book. Beechcroft pretends to have found the book "totally unbelievable".

Closing narration

References
DeVoe, Bill. (2008). Trivia from The Twilight Zone. Albany, GA: Bear Manor Media. 
Grams, Martin. (2008). The Twilight Zone: Unlocking the Door to a Television Classic. Churchville, MD: OTR Publishing.

External links

1961 American television episodes
The Twilight Zone (1959 TV series season 2) episodes
Television episodes written by Rod Serling